A pillar or column is a structural element in architecture.

Pillar or Pillars may also refer to:
 Pillar (landform), a vertical, standing, often spire-shaped, natural rock formation            
 Pillar (band), a Christian rock band
 Pillar (car), a support structure of a car
 Pillar (Lake District), a mountain in England
 Pillar (video game), a 2015 puzzle game for PlayStation 4
 Pillar Data Systems, a company making enterprise storage systems
 City Pillars, a South African football (soccer) club
 "Pillars", a song by rock band Sunny Day Real Estate
 The Pillar, a fictional title in Magic Knight Rayearth
 PILLAR, the Pascal-derived programming language proposed for use in Digital's MICA operating system
 The Pillar, an American news website focusing on the Catholic Church

Surname
 Kevin Pillar, major league baseball player
 Paul R. Pillar, retired CIA National Intelligence Officer

See also
 Pillar box, a free-standing post box in the United Kingdom
 Pillarisation, the dealings of the Dutch and Belgians in their multicultural societies
 Pillar of Fire (disambiguation)
 Pillar Rock (disambiguation)
 Three pillars (disambiguation)
 Four Pillars (disambiguation)
 Five pillars (disambiguation)
 Six pillars (disambiguation)
 Seven pillars (disambiguation)
 
 
 Pillow (disambiguation)

 Pilar (disambiguation)
 Piller (disambiguation)
 Pill (disambiguation)